This article is about the list of Clube Recreativo da Caála players. Recreativo da Caála is an Angolan football (soccer) club based in Caála, Huambo, Angola and plays at Estádio Mártires da Canhala. The club was established in 1944.

2020–2021
C.R. Caála players 2020–2021

2011–2020
C.R. Caála players 2011–2020

2001–2010
C.R. Caála players 2001–2010

References

C.R. Caála
C.R. Caála players
Association football player non-biographical articles